The 51 elected members of the Parliament of Fiji were elected on 14 November 2018.

List of MPs

References

 2018